The Magnay Baronetcy, of Postford House in the County of Surrey, was a title in the Baronetage of the United Kingdom. It was created on 8 November 1844 for William Magnay, a wholesale stationer and Lord Mayor of London from 1843 to 1844. The second Baronet was a novelist. The title became extinct on the death of the third Baronet on 4 September 1960.

Christopher Magnay, father of the first Baronet, was Lord Mayor of London from 1821 to 1822.

Magnay baronets, of Postford House (1844)
Sir William Magnay, 1st Baronet (1797–1871)
Sir William Magnay, 2nd Baronet (1855–1917)
Sir Christopher Boyd William Magnay, 3rd Baronet (1884–1960)

Arms

References

1844 establishments in the United Kingdom
Extinct baronetcies in the Baronetage of the United Kingdom